The 1967 Men's African Volleyball Championship was in Tunis, Tunisia, with 4 teams participating in the continental championship.

Teams

Results

Final ranking

References
 Men Volleyball Africa Championship 1967 Tunis (TUN)

1967 Men
African championship, Men
Men's African Volleyball Championship
International volleyball competitions hosted by Tunisia
1967 in Tunisian sport